Leon's Furniture Ltd. (Meubles Léon Limité in Quebec) is a Canadian furniture retailer which first opened its store in 1909 in Welland, Ontario. The controlling interest in the company is owned by the Leon family, while some shares are traded publicly on the Toronto Stock Exchange. The company has stores in all provinces of Canada.

History

Leon's originated in the city of Welland, Ontario near the US border in the Niagara Region. It was founded by Ablan Leon, a Lebanese immigrant, who started out as factory worker and then a door-to-door salesman. He was able to open a store with his profits in 1909. The original store (A. Leon Company at 244 King Street) was a dry goods outlet, which subsequently converted to furniture sales.

Leon's original store was staffed primarily by his family. When he died in 1942, he left the company to his children. After expanding the original location, they built new stores in Southwestern Ontario.

The company moved into the Toronto area in the subsequent decades, purchasing several established outlets in the city and converting them to Leon's name. The company went public in 1969 and opened its first warehouse showroom in 1973, touting it as the only one in Canada.

Today, roughly half of the store's more than 50 outlets are owned corporately, while the remainder, mainly in rural areas or in cities with lower populations, are owned by franchisees. There were briefly two stores in Arizona in the mid 1990s.

On November 11, 2012, Leon's announced plans to acquire competing furniture chain The Brick for $700 million.

Leon's took over eight Sears Home locations in 2016, a move that allowed Leon's to open its first store in the province of BC.

Products
Leon's Furniture markets mid-range furniture, appliances and electronics; some items are discount, and some stores contain high-end showrooms with higher-priced items available. A major part of Leon's marketing strategy is its financing plans, which allow customers to defer payments for various lengths of time (the most common of which are 6 and 18-month terms). This financing is offered through Flexiti Financial.
 
In an effort to attract customers living in condos or smaller dwellings, Leon's launched their Urban Living Collection in June 2007, comprising smaller sized sofas, bedrooms and dining sets.

Personnel

The staff of Leon's Furniture is separated into numerous departments in many of its corporate locations (franchise operating procedures tend to vary). Employees receive a number of benefits, including profit sharing and other benefits packages for full-time staff.

Slogans

 "All the savings you can carry" — mid-late 1970s
 "It's a better way to buy furniture" — 1992
 "Canada's Only Furniture Superstore" — 2000
 "Leon's — Where Big Is Beautiful — In So Many Ways" — 2000–2004
 "Leon's — It's All About Trust" — 2004–2016
 "Leon's — Part of the Family" — 2016–Present

Charities
Leon's celebrated its 100th anniversary with a donation to Boys & Girls Clubs of Canada. Leon's has also supported organizations such as Canadian Cancer Society, Salvation Army, Cerebral Palsy Association and YWCA, among others.

Competition

Competitors of Leon's include:
 Mattress Mattress Inc
 Jeff Ware Arrow Furniture
 Sleep Country
 The Brick, competing furniture store that was acquired by Leon's Furniture Limited in 2012
 Lastman's Bad Boy Furniture
 Wholesale Furniture Brokers
 Teppermans
 Wayfair
 Ashley HomeStore

References

Leon's Customer service

External links

Companies listed on the Toronto Stock Exchange
Furniture retailers of Canada
Companies based in Toronto
Canadian brands
Retail companies established in 1909
1909 establishments in Ontario